Crataegus biltmoreana is a species of hawthorn native to the Southeastern United States. It is one of many hawthorn species named by Chauncey Delos Beadle when he worked at the Biltmore Estate. The fruit are green, yellow, or orange. It is sometimes considered to be a synonym of C. intricata.

See also
 List of hawthorn species with yellow fruit

References

biltmoreana
Trees of the Southeastern United States
Trees of the Great Lakes region (North America)
Trees of the Eastern United States